James Griffiths is a British television and film director and producer. Griffiths is currently a producer on A Million Little Things, Black-ish, and its Freeform spinoff, Grown-ish. Griffiths also directed and executive produced ABC’s newest series, Stumptown.

Career 
Griffiths began his career directing music videos, and later began directing television in the United Kingdom. Griffiths directed every episode of Free Agents and the first season of Episodes.

Griffiths executive produced The Mayor and directed the pilot episode of Cooper Barrett's Guide to Surviving Life and Up All Night. All this came after Griffiths directed his first feature film Cuban Fury in 2014. Previously, his 2006 short film The One and Only Herb McGwyer Plays Wallis Island premiered at the Toronto Shorts Festival, earning the Best Short Film award at the Edinburgh International Film Festival and a BAFTA nomination.

In 2019, Griffiths renewed his contract with ABC Studios for another two years, which includes a development contract with his own production company, Fee Fi Fo Films.

References

External links

British expatriates in the United States
British television directors
British film directors
Living people
Place of birth missing (living people)
Year of birth missing (living people)